The 2011 Apertura Liguilla Final is a two-legged football match-up to determine the 2011 Apertura champion.

After 17 matches on the regular season, and 2 two-legged rounds of Liguilla, Tigres UANL and Santos Laguna have reached the final.

This final was the third of Santos Laguna in 4 tournaments, the other two where in the Bicentenario 2010 losing against Toluca on a penalty shoot-out and the Apertura 2010 losing against Monterrey with the score of 5 - 3.

This final was the first of Tigres UANL since 2003, when they lost 3 - 2 on aggregate against Pachuca. Also Tigres UANL hadn't won the league since the 1981–82 season when they became winners against Atlante on a penalty shoot-out.

Final rules 
Like other match-ups in the knockout round, the teams will play two games, one at each team's home stadium. As the highest seeded team determined at the beginning of the Liguilla, will have home-field advantage for the second leg.

However, the tiebreaking criteria used in previous rounds will not be the same in the final. If the teams remained tied after 90 minutes of play during the 2nd leg, extra time will be used, followed by a penalty shootout if necessary.

Route to the final

Final

First leg

Second leg

References

 
Tigres UANL matches
Santos Laguna matches